Cuchulainns is a camogie club that participated in the foundation of the game of camogie in 1904. Cuchulainns wore a navy gym tunic with a dark blue and white checked blouse.

External links
 Camogie.ie Official Camogie Association Website

Gaelic games clubs in Dublin (city)
Camogie clubs in County Dublin